C, The Complete Reference is a book on computer programming written by Herbert Schildt. The book gives an in-depth coverage of the C language and function libraries features. 

The first edition was released by Osbourne in 1987. The current version is 4th. Last revision: January 13th, 2018.

See also 

 The Art of Computer Programming

References

External links 
 Herbert Schildt Official website

Computer programming books
C (programming language)